The Bình Hòa Massacre was a massacre purportedly conducted by South Korean forces between December 3 and December 6, 1966, of 430 unarmed citizens in Bình Hòa village, Quảng Ngãi Province in South Vietnam. In 2000, however, it was reported that a monument within the village, gave the dates of the massacre as October 22, 24, and 26, 1966 and said that 403 people were killed by the South Koreans.

The district was in the operational area of the Blue Dragon Brigade. Most of the victims were children, elderly and women. More than half the victims were women (including seven who were pregnant) and 166 children. The South Korean soldiers burnt down all of the houses and killed hundreds of cows and buffalo after the atrocities. A number of the survivors of the massacre joined the Viet Cong and fought against the United States and its Allies, one of which was South Korea.  South Korean forces were also accused of conducting a similar massacre in Binh Tai village within the same year.

The massacre was discussed when British journalist Justin Wintle visited Vietnam in the late 1980s, where the report on the massacre was disclosed to Western media.

In popular culture 
The Binh Hoa massacre was featured in a Korean documentary The Last Lullaby on the subject of Korean war crimes in South Vietnam.

See also

List of massacres in Vietnam
Military history of South Korea during the Vietnam War
War Remnants Museum

References

Further reading
 Kim, Hyun Sook Lee. Korea's "Vietnam Question": War Atrocities, National Identity, and Reconciliation. Positions: East Asia Cultures Critique, Volume 9, Number 3, Winter 2001, p. 622-635. E-ISSN 1527-8271

External links
 Binh Hoa Massacre 

Massacres in Vietnam
Vietnam War crimes by South Korea
Massacres in 1966
Massacres committed by South Korea
History of Quảng Ngãi province
1966 in Vietnam
December 1966 events in Asia
Military history of South Korea during the Vietnam War